Carnegie Caulfield Cycling Club is an Australian cycling club based in the eastern suburbs of Melbourne. Established in the early 1900s, it has a long history of road, criterium and track racing. Carnegie-Caufield riders have won multiple cycling premierships at both senior and junior level. Its members have gone on to win multiple national and world championships as well as participate at the Olympics.

Club history
Originally known as the Carnegie Amateur Cycling Club, the club traces its history back over 100 years. Early races were typically handicap races over 10–60-mile road courses, often starting at the Rosstown Hotel before making their way along Dandenong Road.

The club also played a big part in the local community, in particular through its support for the Oakleigh Carnival. Around this time, the club formalised the first incarnation of its junior program recorded in 1931 after early success in the Victoria Club Premierships. At the same time, Carnegie's senior team also won major races.

During the 1950s, Carnegie track racing, held at its local track Packer Park, drew crowds of up to 4000 spectators watching some of Australia's best amateur and professional riders. The quality of Carnegie's track racing was a key driver behind the push by the NSW Cycling Union to move the 1956 Melbourne Olympics track cycling programme to the Carnegie velodrome after delays in the resurfacing of the Olympic Park Velodrome. Although the push did not succeed – the Olympic track program was held at Olympic Park – subsequent issues with the Olympic track created a second push to move the Australian Titles (to be held after the Olympics) to the Carnegie Velodrome.

Carnegie's track racing program become even more popular during the 1960s and 1970s with the Caulfield Cup on Wheels being the leading race for amateur cyclists in Melbourne, often being held on the same night as the Melbourne Cup on Wheels, an equivalent race for professional cyclists.

In 1984, Carnegie Amateurs Cycling Club merged with Brighton-South Caulfield Professional Cyclists Association to form Carnegie Caulfield Cycling Club.

More recently, the club's summer criterium racing has become very popular, attracting some of the best riders in the World and is regularly covered in leading cycling publications including Cyclingnews.com. This success, however, did attract some unwanted attention in 2013.

Racing
The club hosts a range of races over the course of the year. In summer, criterium races are held on Sunday mornings at Glenvale Crescent and Tuesday evenings at Sandown Raceway. The club also holds track racing and training during summer. Over winter, the club runs longer road races east of Melbourne.

Criterium racing
Between October and April each summer, Carnegie Caulfield holds weekly criterium races on Sunday mornings at Glenvale Crescent, Mulgrave and on Tuesday evenings at Sandown Raceway. Races are typically between 45 and 60 minutes and are conducted on circuits with little to no vehicle traffic. Racing caters for all levels of riders, from elite male and female professionals to juniors and novice riders. It is not uncommon for 300+ riders to attend a day's racing.
At the elite end, A Grade has hosted some of the world's best riders, including:
 Tour de France yellow jersey winner, and UCI World Road Race Champion Cadel Evans
 Tour de France yellow jersey winner, Olympic Gold Medallist, UCI World Pursuit Champion and World Hour Record Holder Sir Bradley Wiggins
 Tour de France green jersey winner Baden Cooke
 Vuelta a Espana King of the Mountains winner Simon Clarke
 Giro d'Italia King of the Mountains winner Matt Lloyd
 Milan–San Remo and Liège–Bastogne–Liège winner Simon Gerrans

Glenvale Crescent has also hosted some of the world's leading female riders, including:
 Olympic Road Race Gold Medallist, UCI World Road Race Champion, Nicole Cooke
 Olympic Road Race Gold Medallist, Elizabeth Tadich
 Olympic Road Race Gold Medallist, Kathy Watt
 World Individual Pursuit Champion, Katie Mactier
 Two-time winner of UCI World Cup Anna Millward

For most of the season, women race alongside men, with prizes paid for the first ~3 women across the line in each grade (depending on overall numbers). There also 2–3 women's only races held over the course of the summer criterium racing season.

The club also conducts a cycling clinic for junior riders at both Glendale Crescent and Sandown each week. Riders are taught bunch riding and racing skills by Tokyo Olympian Mick Hollingworth for around 20 minutes before they are set free to race for 10 minutes.

Race entries are accepted on the day.

Carnegie Caulfield's summer criterium are internationally renowned and have been cited as some of the best racing in Australia.

Multiple independent websites provided advice to new riders looking to get into racing with Carnegie Caulfield

Track racing
Carnegie Caulfield offers track racing for riders of all levels. The club has also received significant support from state and federal government, most recently in relation to installing new flood lighting

Winter road racing
Over winter, Carnegie Caulfield holds mass start and handicap races east of Melbourne. Races are typically between 80 km and 100 km. The club also holds a major race at Phillip Island Grand Prix Circuit each year in May.

Elite team
Carnegie Caulfield's elite team has had a successful history over several decades. The team has raced at high-profile events such as the Bay Classic Series. More recently, the club has partnered with Switzer to enter a team in the Victoria Racing Series. The 2015 team was composed of
 Jack Hickey
 Adam Mulford
 Stefan Imberger
 Alex Holden
 Matthew Bennett
 Simon Frost
 Jake Klajnblat

Junior development program
The club also offers a comprehensive training program for junior riders. The program, coached by Olympian Hilton Clarke Snr., has produced over 15 world and over 100 national champions. Several riders going on to have a successful career on the World Tour Cycling circuit.

Awards
Carnegie Caulfield has been awarded the Australian Club Premiership by Cycling Australia 7 times in the last 10 years

Club members

Olympians and Paralympians
Club riders have represented Australia at 13 Olympic and Paralympics Games

1956 – Melbourne
41st, Individual Road Race – John O'Sullivan

1964 – Tokyo
14th, Individual Road Race – Mick Hollingworth
Qtr Finals, Tandem – Daryl Perkins

1968 – Mexico City
14th, 1000m Time Trial – Hilton Clarke
10th, Tandem – Hilton Clarke

1984 – Los Angeles
14th, 1000m Time Trial – Max Rainsford
Repechage, Sprint – Max Rainsford
DNF, Individual Road Race – Gary Trowell

1998 – Calgary
14th, 1,500m Speed Skating – Danny Kah
10th, 5,000m Speed Skating – Danny Kah

1992 – Barcelona
12th, Team Time Trial – Robert Crowe

1992 – Albertville
34th, 1,000m Speed Skating – Danny Kah
23rd, 1,500m Speed Skating – Danny Kah
20th, 5,000m Speed Skating – Danny Kah
12th, 10,000m Speed Skating – Danny Kah

1994 – Lillehammer
25th, 1,500m Speed Skating – Danny Kah
25th, 5,000m Speed Skating – Danny Kah

1996 – Atlanta
 Individual Road Race (CP4) – Peter Homann
 Individual Time Trial (CP4) – Peter Homann
 Omnium (LC2) – Paul Lake
17th, Individual Road Race – Anna Millward
10th, Individual Time Trial – Anna Millward
Semi-final, 5,000m (Athletics) – Julian Paynter

2000 – Sydney
 Individual Road Race (CP4) – Peter Homann
 Team Sprint (LC1-3) – Paul Lake
 3,000m Individual Pursuit (LC2) – Paul Lake
 Individual Time Trial (CP4) – Peter Homann
 1,000m Individual Time Trial (LC2) – Paul Lake

2004 – Athens
 Team Sprint (CP3-4) – Peter Homann
 3,000m Individual Pursuit – Katie Mactier
 Individual Road Race / Time Trial (CP Div 4) – Peter Homann
 3,000m Individual Pursuit (CP Div 4) – Peter Homann

2008 – Beijing
 3,000m Individual Pursuit LC1- Michael Gallagher
 Individual Road Race LC1 – Michael Gallagher
7th, 3,000m Individual Pursuit – Katie Mactier
4th, Team Sprint – Mark French
Repechage, Sprint – Mark French

2012 – London
 3,000m Individual Pursuit C5- Michael Gallagher
 Individual Time Trial C5 – Michael Gallagher
 Sprint – Shane Perkins
4th, Team Sprint – Shane Perkins

World Champions
Carnegie Caulfield riders have won 15 World Championships since 1988.

1988
 Sprint (Pro) – Stephen Pate

2001
 Sprint (U/19) – Mark French
 Team Sprint (U/19) – Mark French

2004
 Sprint (U/19) – Shane Perkins
 4km Team Pursuit (U/19) – Simon Clarke
 4 km Individual Pursuit (U/19) – Michael Ford
 4 km Team Pursuit (U/19) – Michael Ford

2009
 500m Time Trial (Masters 60–64) – John Hunt

2011
 Kieren – Shane Perkins
 4km Team Pursuit (U/19) – Jack Cummings

2012
 Team Sprint – Shane Perkins
 Sprint (U/19) – Jacob Schmid
 Kieren (U/19) – Jacob Schmid
 4km Team Pursuit (U/19) – Jack Cummings

2014
 Sprint (U/19) – Courtney Field

2015
 4km Team Pursuit (U/19) – James Tickner

National Champions
Club members have won over 100 Australian Champions

1938
 10 Mile Scratch Race (Amateur) – Fred Ashby

1939
 1 Mile Scratch Race (Amateur) – Fred Ashby

1940
 2-mile Team Pursuit (Amateur) – Fred Ashby

1962
 Tandem (Amateur) – Bill Bowker

1963
 4km Team Pursuit (Amateur) – Paul Bowker

1966
 1000m Time Trial (Amateur) – Hilton Clarke Snr.
 4km Team Pursuit (Amateur) – Hilton Clarke Snr.

1967
 1000m Time Trial (Amateur) – Hilton Clarke Snr.
 10-mile Scratch Race (Amateur) – Hilton Clarke Snr.
 4km Team Pursuit (Amateur) – Hilton Clarke Snr.

1968
 1000m Time Trial (Amateur) – Hilton Clarke Snr.
 4km Team Pursuit (Amateur) – Hilton Clarke Snr.

1969
 4km Team Pursuit (Pro) – Hilton Clarke Snr.

1970
 1 mile Scratch Race (Pro) – Hilton Clarke Snr.
 5-mile Scratch Race (Pro) – Hilton Clarke Snr.

1971
 5-mile Scratch Race (Pro) – Hilton Clarke Snr.

1972
 5-mile Scratch Race (Pro) – Hilton Clarke Snr.

1974
 1000m Time Trial (Pro) – Hilton Clarke Snr.
 Madison (Pro) – Hilton Clarke Snr.

1975
 4km Team Pursuit (Pro) – Hilton Clarke Snr.

1976
 10km Scratch Race (Pro) – Hilton Clarke Snr.
 4km Team Pursuit (Pro) – Hilton Clarke Snr.
 
1983
 1000m Time Trial – Max Rainsford

1984
 1000m Time Trial – Max Rainsford
 20km Scratch Race (Amateur) – Stephen Pate

1985
 20km Scratch Race (Amateur) – Stephen Pate
 1000m Time Trial (U/19) – Darren King
 4km Pursuit – Randall McGregor

1986
 20km Scratch Race (Amateur) – Stephen Pate

1986
 Sprint (Pro) – Stephen Pate
 Keiren (Pro) – Stephen Pate
 20km Scratch Race (Pro) – Stephen Pate

1987
 4km Team Pursuit (Pro) – Stephen Pate

1988
 Sprint (Pro) – Stephen Pate
 Keirin (Pro) – Stephen Pate
 20km Scratch Race (Pro) – Stephen Pate
 1 Mile Scratch Race (Pro) – Stephen Pate

1989
 Sprint (Pro) – Stephen Pate
 Keirin (Pro) – Stephen Pate
 1 Mile Scratch Race (Pro) – Stephen Pate
 20km Scratch Race (Pro) – Stephen Pate
 4km Team Pursuit (Pro) – Stephen Pate

1990
 Sprint (Pro) – Stephen Pate
 Keirin (Pro) – Stephen Pate
 1 Mile Scratch Race (Pro) – Stephen Pate
 Elimination (Pro) – Stephen Pate

1991
 Keirin (Pro) – Stephen Pate
 1 Mile Scratch Race (Pro) – Stephen Pate
 20km Scratch Race (Pro) – Stephen Pate
 Elimination (Pro) – Stephen Pate
 4km Team Pursuit (Pro) – Stephen Pate

1992
 Keirin (Pro) – Stephen Pate

1993
 Sprint (Pro) – Stephen Pate
 Keirin (Pro) – Stephen Pate
 1km Scratch Race (Pro) – Stephen Pate
 20km Scratch Race (Pro) – Stephen Pate
 Elimination (Pro) – Stephen Pate
 4km Team Pursuit (Pro) – Stephen Pate

1995
 20km Scratch Race – Stephen Pate
 Keiren – Stephen Pate

1996
 40km Points Score – Stephen Pate
 Madison – Stephen Pate

1997
 Criterium – Stephen Pate
 Madison – Stephen Pate

1998
 Madison – Stephen Pate

2000
 Madison – Stephen Pate
 500m Time Trial (U/17) – Mark French
 10km Scratch Race (U/17) – Mark French
 Flying 200m Time Trial (U/15) – Shane Perkins
 500m Time Trial (U/15) – Shane Perkins
 Sprint (U/15) – Shane Perkins
 10km Scratch Race (U/15) – Michael Ford
 Road Race (U/15) – Michael Ford
 Criterium (U/15) – Michael Ford

2001
 Road Time Trial – Kristjan Snorrason
 Flying 200m Time Trial (U/19) – Mark French
 1000m Time Trial (U/19) – Mark French
 Sprint (U/19) – Mark French
 Kierin (U/19) – Mark French
 Flying 200m Time Trial (U/17) – Shane Perkins
 Sprint (U/17) – Shane Perkins

2002
 3km Team Pursuit (U/17) – Simon Clarke
 Flying 200m Time Trial (U/19) – Mark French
 1000m Time Trial (U/19) – Mark French
 Sprint (U/19) – Mark French
 Kierin (U/19) – Mark French
 Flying 200m Time Trial (U/17) – Shane Perkins
 500m Time Trial (U/17) – Shane Perkins
 4km Team Pursuit (U/19) – Jonny Clarke

2003
 4km Team Pursuit (U/19) – Simon Clarke
 Flying 200m Time Trial (U/19) – Shane Perkins
 1000m Time Trial (U/19) – Shane Perkins
 Sprint (U/19) – Shane Perkins
 Madison (U/19) – Michael Ford

2004
 Flying 200m Time Trial (U/19) – Shane Perkins
 Sprint (U/19) – Shane Perkins
 4km Team Pursuit (U/19) – Simon Clarke
 4km Individual Pursuit (U/19) – Michael Ford
 4km Team Pursuit (U/19) – Michael Ford
 Madison (U/19) – Michael Ford

2007
 4km Team Pursuit – Michael Ford

2010
 2km Individual Pursuit (U/15) – Jack Hickey
 Hill Climb (U/15) – Courtney Field
 Sprint (U/15) – Courtney Field
 500m Time Trial (U/15) – Courtney Field
 2km Individual Pursuit (U/17) – Jack Cummings
 2km Team Pursuit (U/17) – Jack Cummings / Evan Hull / Tom Hamilton
 750m Team Sprint (U/17) – Jack Cummings / Evan Hull
 10km Scratch Race (U/17) – Evan Hull

2011
 Hill Climb (U/15) – Courtney Field
 Sprint (U/15) – Courtney Field
 500m Time Trial (U/15) – Courtney Field
 Scratch Race (U/15) – Courtney Field
 Road Race (U/15) – Courtney Field
 Criterium (U/15) – Courtney Field
 3km Team Pursuit (U/17) – Jack Hickey
 3km Team Pursuit (U/17) – Matt Ross
 500m Time Trial (U/17) – Ruby Greig
 500m Time Trial (U/19) – Adele Sylvester
 Sprint (U/19) – Adele Sylvester

2012
 Sprint (U/17) – Courtney Field
 500m Time Trial (U/17) – Courtney Field
 Team Sprint (U/17) – Courtney Field
 Sprint (U/19) – Jacob Schmid
 Kieren (U/19) – Jacob Schmid

2013
 Cyclo-cross – Lisa Jacob
 Sprint (U/17) – Courtney Field
 Team Sprint (U/17) – Courtney Field
 Scratch Race (U/17) – Courtney Field
 500m Time Trial (U/17) – Courtney Field
 Criterium (U/15) – Alana Field

2014
 Cyclo-cross – Lisa Jacob
 Sprint (U/19) – Courtney Field
 Team Sprint (U/19) – Courtney Field
 Kieren (U/19) – Courtney Field
 2km Individual Pursuit (U/15) – Georgia Cummings
 Points Race (U/15) – Georgia Cummings
 3km Team Pursuit (U/17) – Ryan Koroknai
 2km Team Pursuit (U/17) – Alana Field
 Team Sprint (U/19) – David Koroknai

2015
 Cyclo-cross – Lisa Jacob

Club champions

1999
Road, Elite Men – Kristjan Snorrason

2000
Track, Elite Men – Nick Groves
Road, Elite Men – Kristjan Snorrason

2001
Road, Elite Men – Kristjan Snorrason

2013
Road, Elite Men – Trent Morey

2014
Road, Elite Men – Tim Jamieson
Road, Elite Women – Amber Saunders

2015
Road, Elite Men – Adam Mulford

References

External links

Cycling organisations in Australia
Cycling in Melbourne
Cycling clubs
Organisations based in Melbourne
Cycling teams established in 1924
1924 establishments in Australia
Sport in the City of Glen Eira